Matzek is a surname. Notable people with the surname include:
C. A. E. Matzek (1810–1839?), Prussian entomologist
Karl Matzek (1895–1983), Austrian artist
Mike Matzek (born 1965), American gymnast
Tyler Matzek (born 1990), American baseball pitcher
Virginia Matzek, American ecologist